The 2014 European Road Championships were held in Nyon, Switzerland, between 10 and 13 July 2014. The event consisted of a road race and a time trial for men and women under 23 and juniors. The championships were regulated by the European Cycling Union.

Schedule

Individual time trial
Thursday 10 July 2014
 09:15 Women under-23, 26.90 km
 14:10 Men Juniors, 26.90 km

Friday 11 July 2014
 09:30 Women Juniors, 13.45 km
 14:00 Men under-23, 26.9 km

Road race
Saturday 12 July 2014
 08:30 Women under-23, 129.60 km
 14:15 Men Juniors, 129.60 km

Sunday 13 July 2014
 08:30 Women Juniors, 86.4 km
 13:30 Men under-23, 172.80 km

Events summary

Participating nations
36 nations competed at the Championships.

Medal table

References

External links

 

 
European Road Championships, 2014
Road cycling
Cycling
Road
European Road Championships by year
Nyon